Oliver Atkins Farwell (13 December 1867, Dorchester, Boston, Massachusetts – 18 September 1944, Lake Linden, Michigan) was a herbarium curator, botanist, and drug inspector.

As a boy he moved with his family to Michigan, where he was educated at public schools and the Michigan State Normal School. He taught in 1889 and 1890 at Michigan state secondary schools and from 1890 to 1892 at Michigan State Normal School. In 1892 Farwell became a herbarium curator and drug inspector for Parke, Davis and Company and retired there in 1933. Rogers McVaugh, Stanley A. Cain, and Dale J. Hagenah (1908–1971) wrote a 101-page account of Farwell's life and work.

Selected publications

 1928

References

19th-century American botanists
20th-century American botanists
Eastern Michigan University alumni
Plant collectors
1867 births
1944 deaths